Loughborough Grammar School, founded in 1495 by Thomas Burton, is a private school for boys in the town of Loughborough, Leicestershire, England. Today, roughly one in ten boys at the school are boarders, with the remainder being "day" boys. It is one of four schools known as the Loughborough Schools Foundation, along with Loughborough High School, Fairfield Preparatory School and Loughborough Amherst School. The Schools Foundation are separate independent schools in their own right but share a board of governors. In line with the charitable intent of its founders, Loughborough Grammar School and Loughborough High School offer a number of means-tested bursaries, called School Assisted Places (SAPs), which cover up to 100% of fees.

History
Loughborough Grammar School was founded after Thomas Burton, a prosperous wool merchant from the town, left money for priests to pray for his soul upon his death in 1495; these priests went on to found the school.

Loughborough Grammar is one of England's oldest schools, pre-dating similar institutions such as Radley, Harrow, Winchester, and Westminster by a number of centuries.  Alongside Radley, Winchester, Harrow, Eton, and Dulwich, it is one of a small number of independent boarding schools in Britain that remain for boys only. Notable old boys include: Sir Thomas Abney, who founded the Bank of England; Charles McCurdy, who played a central role in the reforming Liberal Party of the early 20th century; Rev. George Davys, who educated the young Queen Victoria; and the flying ace Air Vice Marshal Johnnie Johnson, who destroyed more Luftwaffe aircraft than any other British pilot. Former masters of the school include the former government minister Lord Elton and author Colin Dexter.

The school was founded in the Parish Church in the centre of Loughborough in 1495, but was moved by the trustees of the Burton Charity to its present location in 1852. A purpose-built site on Burton Walks became its permanent home, initially consisting of the main school building, lodgings, and a gatehouse at the Leicester Road entrance. These buildings were Grade II Listed in the 1980s.

The school celebrated its quincentenary in 1995, when it was visited by HM Queen Elizabeth II. During her visit, the Queen opened the new English block, the "Queen's Building", which includes a state of the art drama studio.

Campus

Loughborough is set within a multi-acre campus on the south side of the town centre; it occupies a site adjacent to Loughborough High School and Fairfield Preparatory School, laid out along Burton Walks. Loughborough Amherst School (formerly Our Lady's Convent School) is situated on Gray Street, about 5 minutes' walk away from the main campus. The core of the LGS campus is the quadrangle, on the eastern side of Burton Walks. Dating from 1850, Big School, consisting of the Victorian Gothic tower, original gymnasium and hall are at the head of the quadrangle, nowadays accommodating the History department, Chapel and Sixth Form common room, and are the oldest buildings on the current site.  The quadrangle is completed by School House (the senior boarding house, which was built as the Headmaster's residence), the Queen's Building (1995, English and Drama), the Barrow Building (c. 1910, Classics and Modern Languages), the Cope Building (2000, Modern Languages) on the north side and the Library and old laboratory buildings (now housing Computing and Religion and Philosophy) on the south side.  Big School and School House are both grade II listed, as is the gatehouse

On the western side of Burton Walks are located the Ireland Building (Physics), the Norman Walter Building (Chemistry), Murray Building (Biology), Pullinger Building (Mathematics) as well as the Hodson Hall, where most school functions and assemblies are held, the Burton Hall, primarily a dining hall, and the Art and Design department, Sports Hall, swimming pool and the Combined Cadet Force's buildings.  A number of houses on this side of the Walks are now owned by the School, including Buckland House, the administrative hub of the School, containing the Headmaster and Deputy Headmasters' offices as well as the general office.  Other houses include Red House, formerly used for music lessons but now largely occupied by the Business Studies, Economics and Politics departments as well as reprographics; Friesland House containing Network Services, and one more houses the Bursary.  Both the Headmaster of the Grammar School and the Headmistress of the High School traditionally reside in properties on the Walks.

The AstroTurf, tennis, and hockey pitches are not strictly part of the school, but are shared with the High School, although a new hockey pitch purely for the school's use was opened in January 2019. The Music School (2006), is also another of these shared buildings, it includes a recital hall as well as practice rooms and recording facilities.

In addition to the main campus, the School owns a  site at the nearby village of Quorn, consisting of sports facilities, including those for rugby, football, cricket, and athletics.

The Burton Chapel is located in Loughborough's Parish Church, school services are held in both this chapel and a second chapel located in the School's quadrangle.

There is a public right of way along Burton Walks connecting the council estate of Shelthorpe with Loughborough town centre.

Academics
Candidates sit an entrance examination to gain admission to the school, in January of Year 6, so as to enter Year 7 at the age of 11. However, the middle school system that still prevails in North West Leicestershire led the School to introduce a smaller Year 6 intake for pupils leaving their primary schools after Year 5, as happens in a middle school system.  There is also a 13+ exam, for those wishing to enter at Year 9, and 16+ entrance based on GCSE performance for boys wishing to enter at Sixth Form level.

In keeping with many other Independent Schools, the choice of subjects at the school tends to be more traditional. The most popular subjects at A Level are Mathematics, History, Biology, Chemistry,  Physics and Geography. Subjects such as Business Studies, Psychology and Physical Education have been introduced at A Level in recent years.

Extracurricular activities

Drama
The department works with that of the High School producing quality productions for boys and girls. They usually perform a large scale musical production, middle school production for the Shakespeare Schools project and a lower school play each year.

Combined Cadet Force
Loughborough Grammar School runs a large Combined Cadet Force (CCF), comprising Royal Navy, Army and RAF sections. About 240 pupils (including a cohort from Loughborough High School and more recently Loughborough Amherst School ) are members of the CCF.  Major events include the annual Remembrance Parade in Loughborough in November, and the Annual Review in May. In 2003, Lt Col George Beazley was awarded the MBE in recognition of his work with the CCF. The CCF used to occupy a number of old Nissen-style huts, but these have been replaced with a purpose-built Cadet Force building, part sponsored by the MOD.  This was opened in 2005. The Royal Naval section of the CCF is affiliated to the Type 45 Daring Class destroyer , whilst the Army section is affiliated to the Royal Anglian Regiment and the RAF Section to RAF Cosford. The first Senior Cadet to be awarded the 'Priestly Sword' was Andy Halliwell in 2013 in recognition of his leadership.

Music
The quality of musical performance at the Loughborough Schools Foundation rivals that of the best schools nationally. Music scholarships are available at 11+, 13+, and 16+ and may be backed up by means-tested bursaries. The construction of a new Music School by the then Endowed Schools in 2006 enabled a greater level of cooperation than had previously been possible, and the wealth of resources available enable the music department to run over fifty musical ensembles each week. There are about 100 performances per year, ranging from the annual orchestra and choral concert in the De Montfort Hall, Leicester, to jazz, brass and chamber music ensembles. The various choirs sing regular evensongs at cathedrals across the country and there is an annual tour, usually to a European destination. The Loughborough Schools Music Big Band and Symphonic Wind Band have competed nationally at the English Concert Band Festival, and these bands also tour abroad regularly. Additionally, Symphonic Wind Band and many of the other ensembles on offer enter the Music For Youth competition annually and regularly compete against world class bands.

Sport
The major sports at the School are rugby, hockey, cricket, tennis, athletics, football, and cross country. The School competes in national competitions in these sports, and has a full structure of teams from U12 to U18 level. The senior cross-country team was victorious in February 2017 in the 46th annual relay race at King Henry VIII School, Coventry. The senior rugby, cricket and hockey teams have all toured abroad in recent years, including separate hockey and cricket tours to South Africa, as well as a recent rugby tour to Australia and The Far East. Other sports include swimming, basketball, badminton, fencing, football, golf, sailing, table tennis, karting, and bridge. Loughborough Dynamo F.C. was formed in 1955 by a group of pupils who no longer wished to play rugby.

Other
The school runs an active Duke of Edinburgh's Award scheme, a Scout Troop and biennial adventurous expeditions, which have visited areas such as the High Atlas Mountains of Morocco, the Himalayas and Greenland.  A number of clubs and societies run regularly, including the Senior Debating Society and a school newspaper made by students, entitled VOX. The school engages in regular charity fund-raising events, including non-uniform days and concerts. An example of this is in February 2018, a raffle event at a concert raised money for the Symphonic Wind Band tour to Ireland in the next summer.

House system
The school operates a house system; every boy is placed in one of four houses: Abney (Green, after Sir Thomas Abney), Yates (Yellow, after William Yates), Pulteney (Purple, after Richard Pulteney) and Davys (Sky blue, after George Davys) and boys below the Upper Sixth have a small line in one of these colours on their school tie, between larger stripes for the school's red and navy colours.  The houses are named after alumni.  The house system provides internal competition in a number of sporting disciplines as well as quiz, chess, bridge and music competitions, with a points system (40 for winning an event down to 10 for finishing fourth) calculating the eventual winner of the Stamper Cup. The Eagle trophy is awarded to the house that wins the most points in non-sporting house competitions.

Headmasters 
The names of the earliest headmasters are not known, and the dates of a few of the early headmasters remain unclear.
 
 ?–1521 Robert Calton
 Richard Sharpe
 John Kyddal
 John Sharpe
 John Tomonne
 1568–1615 John Dawson
 1616–1619 Mr Spong
 1620–1627 Mr Woodmansey
 1627–1631 Mr Atkinson
 1631–1632 Thomas Mould
 1632–1642 Richard Layghtonhouse
 1642–1644 Mr Wilde
 1644–1647 John Blower
 1647–1682 John Somervile
 1682–1686 John Vickers
 1686–1696 John Hoyland
 1696–1748 Samuel Martin
 1748–1773 Thomas Parkinson
 1773–1792 Thomas Hadwen
 1792–1811 Edward Shaw
 1811–1813 John Morgan
 1813–1844 Thomas Stevenson
 1852–1860 John George Gordon
 1860–1875 James Wallace
 1876–1893 John Brise Colgrove
 1894–1900 Cecil William Kaye
 1901–1920 Bingham Dixon Turner
 1920–1926 Tom Stinton
 1926–1955 Sidney Russell Pullinger
 1955–1959 Walter Lucian Garstang
 1959–1973 Norman Sydney Walter
 1973–1984 John Scandrett Millward "Hench"
 1984–1998 (David) Neville Ireland
 1998–2015 Paul B Fisher
 2016–2021 Duncan J Byrne
2021-2022 Dr Christopher Barnett MBE (Interim)
2022–present Dr Daniel Koch

Old Loughburians

Old boys of Loughborough Grammar School are called "Old Loughburians". They form an old boys' association, namely the Old Loughburians Association (commonly OLA).

Notable Old Loughburians include:

 Sir Thomas Abney (1640–1721), merchant, Lord Mayor of London and Member of Parliament.
 Richard Pulteney FRS (1730–1801), botanist.
 Thomas Green (1738–1788), geologist, Woodwardian Professor of Geology.
 Rev. George Davys (1780–1864) educator of Queen Victoria, later Dean of Chester and Bishop of Peterborough.
 Joseph Shaw (1786–1859), Academic and Master of Christ's College, Cambridge.
 William Yates (1792–1845), Baptist missionary and orientalist.
 Thomas Hassall (1840–1920), Australian politician.
 Richard Bowdler Sharpe (1847–1909), zoologist.
 Rt Hon. Sir John Winfield Bonser PC (1847–1914), barrister and Privy Councillor.
 Sir Walter Howell KCB (1854–1913), marine secretary to the Board of Trade.
 Edward Anthony Wharton Gill (1859–1944), author.
 Julius Hare (1859–1932), artist.
 George Harry Barrowcliff (1864–1924), architect.
 Charles McCurdy MP (1870–1941), Liberal MP and government minister.
 W. Sampson Handley FRCS (1872–1962), oncological surgeon.
 William Gaskell CIE (1874–1954), Indian Civil Service
 G.W. Briggs (1875–1959), hymn author, author of school hymn.
 Sir George Bailey (1879–1965), electrical engineer and industrialist.
 Harry Linacre (1880–1957), footballer; Nottingham Forest and England goalkeeper.
 Sir William Coates (1882–1963), civil servant and businessman, director of ICI.
 Archibald Walter Harrison (1882–1946), Methodist person.
 Arthur Dakin (1884–1969), President of the Baptist Union of Great Britain and Ireland.
 Arthur Henry Davis DSO (1886–1931), barrister and soldier.
 Sir Sidney Wadsworth (1888–1976), judge in the Indian Civil Service.
 John Moss CBE (1890–1976), lawyer.
 Brig. Frederick Clarke DSO (1892–1972), British Army officer.
 Tom Hare MRCVS (1895–1959), veterinary pathologist.
 W. C. W. Nixon CBE FRCS FRCOG (1903–1966), obstetrician and gynaecologist
 Colin Tivey (1913–2001), LGS schoolmaster and Special Operations Executive intelligence officer.
 Clifford Dyment (1914–1971), poet.
 John Saxton CBE (1914–1980), physicist.
 Air Vice Marshal Johnnie Johnson CB CBE (1915–2001) senior RAF officer and top-scoring British Second World War flying ace.
 A.D. Walsh FRS (1916–1977), chemist.
 Thomas William Walker ONZM (1916–2010), soil scientist.
 George W. Cooke FRS (1916–1992), chemist and deputy director of Rothamsted Research Station.
 Peter Carter (1921–2004), law professor.
 Sir Denys Wilkinson FRS (born 1922), nuclear physicist.
 William Barry Pennington (1923–1968), mathematician.
 John Stamper (1926–2003), aeronautical engineer.
 Patrick McGoohan (1928–2009), actor and film and television director. 
 Clive Priestley CB (1935–2012), Chairman of St Bartholomew's Hospital Medical College Trust.
 Peter Preston (1938-2018), journalist, former editor of The Guardian.
 Timothy Cook OBE (born 1938), Clerk to the Trustees, City Parochial Foundation.
 Richard Hudson (born 1939), linguist.
 Sir Tim Brighouse (born 1940), educationalist.
 John F Moreton (born 1942), golf historian and author.
 Hubert Lacey (born 1944), psychiatrist.
 Tudor Parfitt (born 1944), Distinguished Professor at Florida. International University, Emeritus Professor at the School of Oriental and African Studies, University of London.
 Julian Besag FRS (1945–2010), statistician.
 Robin Parfitt (1946–2006), educationalist and headmaster of Danes Hill School.
 Roger Pratt (born 1947), cinematographer.
 Stephen Mitchell (born 1949), journalist, Head of Radio News at the BBC.
 David Elliott (born 1949), museum curator.
 Philip Richard Hernaman Allen (born 1949), Commissioner of HM Customs & Excise, author.
 Lt Gen. Andrew Figgures CBE (born 1950), British Army officer.
 Bruce Woolley (born 1953) performer/songwriter.
 David Collier (born 1955), sports administrator.
 Martin Goodman (born 1956), writer, publisher and Emeritus Professor University of Hull.
 John Shaw (1957–2013), radio broadcaster.
 Admiral Sir Trevor Soar KCB OBE (born 1957), senior Royal Navy officer.
 Marcus Rose, (born 1957) rugby player, former England full-back.
 Richard Merriman (born 1958), cricketer, Leicestershire CCC.
 Chris Wreghitt (born 1958), professional cyclist.
 John Dickie (born 1963), Italianist author, historian and academic.
 Patrick MacLarnon (born 1963), cricketer and educator
 Ian Tomlinson FRS (born 1963), Clinician Scientist and Cancer Geneticist.
 David Taylor (born 1963) author and professor of psychopharmacology 
 Adam Wilkinson (born 1965), modernist and marketer in Paris
 Mike Nelson (born 1967), contemporary artist
 Martyn Gidley (born 1968), cricketer.
 Felix Buxton (born 1971), one half of the dance duo Basement Jaxx.
 Wayne Dessaur (born 1971), cricketer, Nottinghamshire CCC.
 Christopher Hawkes (born 1972), cricketer.

 Nigel Mills (born 1974) Conservative MP for Amber Valley since 2010.
 Sqn Ldr Ben Murphy (RAF officer)(born 1975) RAF officer, Red Arrow and Red Bull Air Race Master Class.
 Giles Kristian (born 1975), author and former singer.
 Ben Hammersley (born 1976), journalist.
 Anthony Clark (born 1977), England badminton player.
 Major Adam Foden DSO (born 1978), soldier.
 Stig Abell (born 1980), Editor of the Times Literary Supplement, presenter on Times Radio.
Mark Collett (born 1980), prominent neo-Nazi, former chairman of the Young BNP and subject of Channel 4 documentary Young, Nazi and Proud.
 Charlie Bewley (born 1981), actor.
 Firas Waez (born 1982), one half of electronic music pairing Waze & Odyssey
 Harry Gurney (born 1986), cricketer, England & Nottinghamshire CCC.
 Sam Sweeney, (born 1989), folk musician, Bellowhead.
 Will Hurrell (born 1990), rugby player, Leicester Tigers/Coventry RFC and England U20 wing three-quarter.
 John Brooks (born 1990), professional English football referee, who currently officiates in The Football League and Premier League.
 Matthew Everard (born 1990), rugby player, Nottingham R.F.C.
 David Condon (field hockey) (born 1991), Hockey player, England and Great Britain. 
 Aiden Morris (born 1993), cricketer
 Shiv Thakor (born 1993), cricketer, Former England U19 Captain, sacked Derbyshire CCC player
 Eben Kurtz (born 1995), cricketer
 Murray Matravers and Sam Hewitt, members of the band Easy Life

Masters
Notable masters at the school include:

 Colin "The Bird" Tivey (OL; 1913–2001), taught languages at the school for many years.
 William Williams (1925–2007), former Welsh rugby league international, taught mathematics and sport at the school 1950 to 1962. 
 Colin Dexter (1930–2017), the novelist was a sixth form classics master at the school (1957–59).
 The Hon. Rodney Elton (born 1930), later 2nd Baron, was a master at the school between 1964 and 1967
 Stephen Smith (OL; born 1948), was a history master at the school between 1970 and 1993.
 Trevor Tunnicliffe (OL; born 1950), former first class cricketer, was director of cricket 1995–2013.
 Martyn Gidley (OL; born 1968), former first class cricketer, is currently (2017) a teacher at the school.
 Douglas Robb (born 1970), later headmaster of Oswestry and Gresham's

References

Further reading 
 History of Loughborough Endowed Schools by Alfred White, Loughborough Grammar School, Loughborough, 1969 
 Five Hundred Years Enduring: A History of Loughborough Grammar School, by Nigel Watson, James & James, London, 2000, pp. 144, E28.00, .

External links

 Official website
 BBC league table report for LGS
 ISI Inspection Reports

Educational institutions established in the 15th century
Member schools of the Headmasters' and Headmistresses' Conference
Private schools in Leicestershire
Grade II listed buildings in Leicestershire
Boys' schools in Leicestershire
 
Grade II listed educational buildings
1495 establishments in England
Loughborough
Boarding schools in Leicestershire
Loughborough Dynamo F.C.